Renjith Menon (born 2 May 1977, Ernakulam, Kerala) is an Indian first-class cricketer. He is a right handed lower order batsman and right arm fast medium bowler. He represents Kerala in the Ranji Trophy. He represented Kerala in a total of nine first class and eight list a matches.

External links
Ranjith Menon in Cricinfo
Renjith Menon in Cricket Online

Indian cricketers
Kerala cricketers
Living people
1977 births
Cricketers from Kochi